1978 in Korea may refer to:
1978 in North Korea
1978 in South Korea